Serge Joncour (born 1961) is a French novelist and screenwriter. He was born in Paris and studied philosophy at university. His debut novel UV was published in 1998. Notable books include:
 L'Écrivain national, which won the Prix des Deux Magots 
 Repose-toi sur moi winner of the Prix Interallié
 Chien loup, winner of the Prix Landerneau des Lecteurs, which became the first of his novels to appear in English translation.
 Nature humaine, winner of Prix Femina 2020.

As a screenwriter, he wrote the script for Elle s'appelait Sarah (2011) starring Kristin Scott Thomas.

He was recently suspended from Twitter.

References

1961 births
Living people
French novelists
Prix Interallié winners
Prix Femina winners